The 1967 Philadelphia mayoral election saw the reelection of James Hugh Joseph Tate, who narrowly defeated Republican challenger Arlen Specter in the general election. Specter would later be elected to the U.S. Senate in 1980, where he served until 2011.

In the Democratic primary, Tate successfully fended off a challenge by Alexander Hemphill, who had the backing of Philadelphia Democratic Party Chairman Francis R. Smith.

Primaries

Democratic
Chairman of the Philadelphia Democratic Party Francis R. Smith made an attempt to replace Tate on the ticket with City Controller Alexander Hemphill. However, Tate refused to drop-out of the election. Tate defeated Hemphill in the Democratic primary.

Republican
Incumbent District Attorney of Philadelphia Arlen Specter won the Republican primary.

General election

Campaign
At the opening of the general election campaign, Specter was viewed as the frontrunner.

Tate faced the obstacle of a divided Democratic Party.

Tate supported legislation also endorsed by Cardinal John Krol which would allow state funding of parochial and other private schools, while Specter did not take a stance of this issue.

During the campaign, Tate received heavy media attention by being in Tel Aviv during the outbreak of the Six-Day War and being in Rome when Archbishop Krol was elevated to Cardinal.

Tate benefited from positive regards for the city's ability to keep greater peace amid the long, hot summer of 1967 than many other major cities had been able to.

Tate thought he needed to send a "law and order" message to secure reelection, and therefore appointed Frank Rizzo as Philadelphia Police Commissioner. During the campaign, Tate was asked many times whether he planned to keep Rizzo in this position if reelected.

Since Specter was a former liberal member of the Democratic party, he was able to receive the backing of much of Philadelphia's political establishment, as well as many liberal Democrats, such as the group Americans for Democratic Action.

Specter presented himself as being able to usher in a continuance of the liberal reform policies of Tate's immediate two predecessors, Richardson Dilworth and Joseph S. Clark Jr. Tate countered this by having Clark make appearances on the campaign trail with him.

Polls anticipated a Specter victory.

Results
Tate won reelection by a narrow margin.

It is believed that Tate, the city's first Catholic mayor, received strong support from the Catholic electorate. He performed well in Catholic wards of the city. It is also believed that Tate benefited from strong turnout among labor voters.

While Tate carried the city's African American wards, he received less support in these wards than was typical at the time for the Democratic Party.

Specter, who would have become the city's first Jewish mayor had he won, carried the city's wards with a primarily Jewish population.

Specter won a majority of the white vote.

References

1967
Philadelphia
1967 Pennsylvania elections
1960s in Philadelphia